Tarek El-Said (born 5 April 1978) is a former Egyptian footballer. He was a left winger who played for Al-Ahly, Zamalek, and Anderlecht in the Belgian First Division.

Career
Tarek started as a youth player in Al-Ahly team under the coaching of Hossam El-Badry. Then he transferred to Zamalek at the age of 14, he earned his chance to play for the first team in 1998. He helped Zamalek achieve many tournament successes, and got the title of Egyptian League Top Scorer (2000–01) and was chosen the best Egyptian footballer in the same year. Then Tarek traveled to wear the shirts of famous Belgian club RSC Anderlecht, for a whole year.  He returned Zamalek, because of injury.

After three years of difficulties in Zamalek, he regained his top performance with Al-Ahly after returning home again in July 2006. His accurate crosses helped to qualify for 2006 FIFA Club World Cup in Japan.

Tarek played for the Egyptian Olympic team until 1999. He debuted for the senior side on 12 November 1999 against Ghana in a friendly match that ended 2–1 for Ghana. His last national game was versus Belgium in a friendly game that ended 4–0 for the Egyptians, 9 February 2005.

Honours and achievements
Zamalek
 African Cup Winners Cup: 2000
 Egyptian Super Cup: 2000–01                                                                                                                                      
 Egyptian League: 2000–01, 2002–03, 2003–04
 Egyptian Soccer Cup: 1998–99
 CAF Super Cup: 2002–03
 Arab Champions League: 2002–03

Al Ahly 
 FIFA Club World Cup bronze medalist: 2006
 CAF Super Cup: 2007
 CAF Champions League: 2006
 Egyptian League: 2006–07
 Egyptian Soccer Cup: 2007
 Egyptian Super Cup: 2006

Individual
 Egyptian League top scorer: 2000–01 (with 13 goals)
 Best Egyptian footballer of the year: 2000
 Scored 5 Goals for Zamalek in African Club Cups

References

External links

1978 births
Living people
People from Tanta
Association football wingers
Association football fullbacks
Egyptian footballers
Egypt international footballers
Zamalek SC players
Al Ahly SC players
R.S.C. Anderlecht players
Egyptian Premier League players
Belgian Pro League players
Egyptian expatriate footballers
Expatriate footballers in Belgium
Egyptian expatriate sportspeople in Belgium
2000 African Cup of Nations players
2002 African Cup of Nations players
2004 African Cup of Nations players